Flanker 2.0 is a combat flight simulator developed by Eagle Dynamics and released in 1999. It is a direct sequel to Su-27 Flanker. The game allows players to fly the Sukhoi Su-27 and Su-33 in combat missions. In 2001, a major patch titled Flanker 2.5 was released for free to users who already owned Flanker 2.0, but was also available as a fully new purchasable game.

Reception
IGN reviewed Flanker 2.0 with a rating of 7/10. The limited accessibility and frustrating campaign were criticized, concluding "there's a strong enough sim lurking in this hostile game that passionate flight simmers will find a real treat once they've cracked the shell and accepted the limitations. Anyone else need not apply." GameSpot reviewed Flanker 2.0 with a rating of 8.7/10, praising the graphical improvements and mission editor while critiquing the audio and campaign compared to contemporaries such as Falcon 4.0. PC Gamer US nominated Flanker 2.0 for its 1999 "Best Simulation" award, but it lost to MiG Alley. The editors wrote that Flanker 2.0 is "not everyone's cup of tea, and even veteran simmers find it a challenge to master every vagary of the Su-27. But for sheer authenticity, it can't be topped." In the United States, Flanker 2.0 sold 7,285 copies by April 2000.

Flanker 2.5 won PC Gamer USs "2002 Best Simulation" award. The magazine's Andy Mahood wrote, "When a $10 upgrade package (for a three-year-old combat flight sim, no less!) takes our 2002 Flight Sim of the Year honors, it's a remarkably sad commentary on the state of the genre". However, he praised the game as superior to Combat Flight Simulator 3 and Strike Fighters: Project 1, and declared that it "absolutely deserves" players' attention. Flanker 2.5 won GameSpots annual "Best Simulation on PC" award, and was a runner-up in the publication's "Best Budget Game on PC" category, which went to Serious Sam: The Second Encounter.

Sequels 

 Lock On: Modern Air Combat is a continuation of the Flanker series.
 Digital Combat Simulator includes Su-27, Su-33 and J-11 simulations descended from the Flanker and Lock On versions.

References

External links
 Flanker 2.0 at MobyGames
 http://www.gamespot.com/reviews/flanker-25-review/1900-2863737/
 https://web.archive.org/web/20050112000010/http://archive.gamespy.com/reviews/april02/flanker/
 https://web.archive.org/web/20051227233811/http://pc.gamezone.com/gzreviews/r15531.htm

1999 video games
Combat flight simulators
Ubisoft games
Video games developed in Russia
Windows games
Windows-only games